Fathabad (also Romanized as Fatḩābād) is a village in Esfandan Rural District, in the Central District of Komijan County, Markazi Province, Iran. At the 2006 census, its population was 440, in 119 families.

References 

Populated places in Komijan County